The Military ranks of Mauritania are the military insignia used by the Armed Forces of Mauritania. Being a former colony of France, Mauritania shares a rank structure similar to that of France.

Commissioned officer ranks
The rank insignia of commissioned officers.

Other ranks
The rank insignia of non-commissioned officers and enlisted personnel.

References

External links
 

Mauritania
Military of Mauritania
Mauritania